Chagoury is a surname. Notable people with the surname include:

Gilbert Chagoury (born 1946), Lebanese-Nigerian businessman, diplomat, and philanthropist
Ronald Chagoury (born 1949), Nigerian businessman
Antonio Chagoury (born 1973), American businessman and technologist

See also
Chagoury Group, a Nigerian multinational business conglomerate